Siddiqua Kabir (May 7, 1931 – January 31, 2012) was a Bangladeshi nutritionist, academic, cookbook author, and cooking show television host. A professor, Kabir hosted, and guest starred in numerous television shows featuring Bangladeshi cuisine, including Siddiqua Kabir's Recipe on NTV Bangla.

Early life and education
Kabir was born in Dhaka, on May 7, 1931. She was the second of the six children. She lost her father at the age of 17. She attended college for mathematics and received a master's degree on the subject. With a scholarship from the Ford Foundation, she obtained her second master's degree in Food, Nutrition and Institutional Administration from Oklahoma State University in 1963.

Career
Kabir began her teaching career in 1957 by joining the mathematics department of Eden Girls' College in Azimpur, Dhaka. She joined the nutrition department of College of Home Economics, Azimpur, Dhaka, from where she retired as the principal in 1993.

Kabir appeared in her first television cooking show in 1966, leading a long career in numerous cooking shows as a presenter and guest. She also authored cookbooks, including "Ranna Khaddya Pushti", and "Bangladesh Curry Cookbook." Her career further led to consultant work for major foreign and Bangladeshi consumer food brands, such as Radhuni, Dano, and Nestlé.

Kabir had received several awards from the food and television industries, including the Sheltech Award in 2009.

Personal life and death
Kabir was married to Syed Ali Kabir, a journalist and former Deputy Governor of Bangladesh Bank. Kabir died at Square Hospital in Dhaka on January 31, 2012, at the age of 80.

Awards
 Anannya Top Ten Awards (2004)

References

1931 births
2012 deaths
People from Dhaka
University of Dhaka alumni
Oklahoma State University alumni
Bangladeshi women academics
Women cookbook writers
Bangladeshi television chefs
Nutritionists
Bangladeshi women writers
Bangladeshi writers
Women food writers
Women chefs
Academic staff of Eden Mohila College
Bangladeshi chefs
Bangladeshi cookbook writers